The Formula Vee concept was brought to New Zealand by Barry Munro. Munro was an Officer in the New Zealand Army and built the first Formula Vee in the country. The chassis design was started in 1966 with the first mock-up being completed in November that year before the car was completed in March the following year (1967). In those days all racing cars needed to be road registered, the Munro Vee was first registered on 10 February 1967. Built with affordability in mind and limited technology available to him, Munro made the nose cone by using a wool coat shaped over metal ribs and set with a resin. During the 1967 season, Munro entered the car in its first race at Levin in March and raced the car as much as he could, entering it in any class he could to build the profile of the car and start creating interest for others to join him in making a Formula Vee. Digby Taylor was the next to build a Formula Vee and it didn't take long before the first all Formula Vee race was ready to take place.

Formula Vee has proven itself as a winning formula for driver development and great racing over its 50 years in New Zealand. From producing Formula 1 and IndyCar drivers and touring car champions.  The New Zealand Formula First Championship included many big names through the championship over the years, most notably Scott Dixon, Brendon Hartley, Liam Lawson, Shane van Gisbergen, Mitch Evans and Richie Stanaway.

History

On 25 November 1967, around six cars lined up at Levin for the first ever Formula Vee race in New Zealand. Barry Munro, George Hettercheid, Roy King, Digby Taylor, John Macey, Ivan Berry, Brian Yates, and Phil Deer made up the grid for the first race at Bay Park. The class quickly made it to the top events, including the 'Rothmans National' meeting at Pukekohe.

50 Years later, the class is still in existence, although still sticking with the core Formula Vee concept such as using the  VW engine. The cars developed over the years while still maintaining their affordability and 'simplistic' nature allowing almost anyone to successfully run a car. Another change in the class was its renaming at the start of the 1998–99 season to 'Formula First' to reflect its part in the motorsport pathway.

Formula First TV

Originally, Formula First TV was known as NZ Formula First on their YouTube channel with Jordie Peters, both interviewing, filming and editing race footage. The first episode premiered on YouTube on 24 October 2015. Just over one and a half years later the first ever episode of Formula First TV premiered on 6 May, 2017 on YouTube with presenters Jonathan Morton and Sheridan Bonner. Both presenters are still currently employed in these roles, as well as other one-off presenters such as Callum Crawley and Conrad Clark.

Success stories

The New Zealand Formula First Championship has a history of producing champions. The class has proven it is the first step in forging a successful motor racing career, allowing competitors to learn the essentials of race craft in a low-cost formula. It is hard to look back at Kiwi drivers who have gone on to win championships at home and abroad and find one that didn't start with Formula First. Scott Dixon became NZ's first 'junior driver', entering the championship at 12 years of age and winning the National Championship in his rookie season. Formula One driver, WEC Champion and LeMans 24 hour winner Brendon Hartley was another driver who started their racing with Formula First in their early teens. Open wheeler Mitch Evans is another of those success stories the class has seen over the years. The SpeedSport Scholarship, originally a partnership between Grant McDonald's SpeedSport magazine and Dennis Martin's Sabre Motorsport team has seen many of NZ's recent stars kick-start their careers in Formula First. The majority of the scholarships recipients have gone on to win championships and have produced some of the most recognisable names in Motorsport including 2016 Supercars champ Shane van Gisbergen, 3x NZGP winner and SuperGT champ Nick Cassidy as well as GP2 race winner and ADAC Formula 3 champ Richie Stanaway along with rising star Liam Lawson.

Current drivers' championship

Past champions

Records

References

Open wheel racing
1967 establishments in New Zealand
Motorsport competitions in New Zealand